Bring Happiness Home (Chinese: 快乐到家) is a 2013 Chinese film. It stars the hosts of the Chinese variety show Happy Camp, who filmed it for their 15th anniversary.

References

Chinese comedy films